Acequia Park is located in the city of San Antonio in the U.S. state of Texas.  There are picnic tables and restrooms, but alcohol is not allowed in the park.  The origins of the park date back to Spanish missionaries, who worked with mission Indians to create a water system sourced by the San Antonio River. The San Antonio Conservation Society (SACS) purchased much of this acreage in 1957 to preserve the area's environment. Because the San Antonio River Authority planned to reconfigure the river channel, SACS joined local land owners in filing a successful water rights and water flow lawsuit against the Authority. In 1975, SACS deeded the property to the City of San Antonio with the stipulation that it be used as a public park.

See also

National Register of Historic Places listings in Bexar County, Texas

References

External links

Parks in San Antonio
Tourist attractions in San Antonio
Historic district contributing properties in Texas
San Antonio Missions National Historical Park